Yu Keping is the Director of the Center for Chinese Government Innovations at Peking University. He is a noted scholar having produced many noted books including the widely noted Democracy is a Good Thing. In addition to his academic work he has also acted as an advisor on political reforms to the Chinese government.

Yu is also the New World Senior Fellow in the Ash Center for Democratic Governance and Innovation in the John F. Kennedy School of Government, Harvard University.

Writings
Books
 
 Yu, K. (2010). Democracy and the Rule of Law in China Leiden: Brill
 Yu, K. (2009). Democracy is a good thing: Essays on politics, society, and culture in contemporary China. Washington, D.C: Brookings Institution Press.

References 

Living people
Academic staff of Peking University
21st-century Chinese philosophers
Chinese political philosophers
Year of birth missing (living people)